Takrouna Bluff is a small but prominent bluff on the east side of Alamein Range in the Freyberg Mountains, overlooking Canham Glacier from a position 6 nautical miles (11 km) west-southwest of Galatos Peak. Named by the northern party of New Zealand Geological Survey Antarctic Expedition (NZGSAE), 1963–64, after Takrouna, a similar feature in Tunisia associated with Lord Freyberg and the Second New Zealand Expeditionary Force during World War II.

Cliffs of Victoria Land
Pennell Coast